Kwon Ki-Bo  (born 4 May 1982) is a South Korean footballer who plays as goalkeeper.

External links 

1982 births
Living people
South Korean footballers
Suwon Samsung Bluewings players
Association football goalkeepers